The 2014 All-Ireland Senior Hurling Championship was the 127th staging of the All-Ireland championship since its establishment by the Gaelic Athletic Association in 1887. The draw for the 2014 fixtures took place on 3 October 2013. The championship began on 27 April 2014 and ended on 7 September 2014.

On 7 June 2014 Kilkenny versus Offaly was broadcast on Sky Sports, the first time a Championship fixture was broadcast live to a UK-wide audience. British viewers were reported to have been "amazed and confused", "bemused but impressed" and "amused and confounded" after seeing hurling for the first time.

Clare entered the championship as defending champions, however, they were defeated by Wexford. Kilkenny won the All-Ireland title following a 2–17 to 2–14 defeat of Tipperary after a replay.

Overview

All teams from the 2013 championship continued to line out in hurling's top tier in 2014.

On 23 March 2013, the GAA's annual Congress adopted a proposal from the Central Competition Controls Committee (CCCC) which sought to introduce a round-robin qualifying group in Leinster for five designated counties.

Ten counties competed in the 2013 Leinster championship; however, the CCCC proposal decreased the Leinster competition to a field of five regulars, namely Kilkenny, Dublin, Wexford, Offaly and Galway, alongside two more from a round-robin qualifying group featuring Laois, Westmeath, Carlow, London and Antrim. These five teams each played four games, with the top two qualifying for the Leinster Championship quarter-finals. The fourth-placed team met the winner of the Christy Ring Cup in a promotion/relegation play-off. The bottom county faced automatic relegation to the Christy Ring Cup.

Personnel and kits

Summary

Championships

Broadcasting
In the first year of a deal running from 2014 until 2016, a total of 45 provincial and All-Ireland championship matches in hurling and football were broadcast live on television in Ireland.
A total of 31 games will be shown by RTÉ and 14 by Sky Sports for the first time. TV3's six year-involvement with broadcasting games came to an end in 2013. Sky Sports will also broadcast live the All-Ireland Hurling and Football semi-finals and finals along with RTÉ.

The first game to be broadcast by Sky Sports was the Leinster quarter-final between Kilkenny and Offaly in Nowlan Park on Saturday 7 June.	
Rachel Wyse and Brian Carney were announced as presenters of Sky's coverage, with Dave McIntyre and Mike Finnerty as commentators. Analysts for the hurling championship were Jamesie O'Connor and Nicky English.	

In May, the GAA and RTÉ launched a new streaming service called GAAGO intended to stream championship games worldwide.	
The subscription-based service will be available to fans everywhere in the world outside of the island of Ireland, including all the games broadcast in Ireland exclusively by Sky Sports.	
All 45 televised games from the football and hurling championships, as broadcast by both RTÉ and Sky will be available to watch on GAAGO.
For Great Britain, the games broadcast by Sky will only be available through Sky.
The price for a worldwide GAAGO 'Season Pass' is €110 while in Britain, the GB Pass will be €60. A pay-per-game option is available for €10, and this will rise to €14 for the quarter-final, semi-final and final stages of the championship.

Despite massive interest in the Leinster hurling semi-final replay between Kilkenny and Galway on 28 June, the game will not be shown live on television. The throw in time is fixed for 7.00pm and Sky Sports are already covering the Ulster football semi-final between Monaghan and Armagh with the GAA's television contracts preventing live television coverage of two championship games at the same time.		

These matches were broadcast live on television in Ireland

Leinster Senior Hurling Championship

Qualifying group 

Round 1

Round 2

Round 3

Round 4

Round 5

Promotion play-off

Knock-out

Munster Senior Hurling Championship

All-Ireland qualifiers

Round 1

Round 2

All-Ireland Senior Hurling Championship

Quarter-finals

Semi-finals

Final

Statistics

Scoring
First goal of the championship: 
Marty Kavanagh for Carlow against London (27 April 2014)
Widest winning margin: 26 points
Kilkenny 5-32 - 1-18 Offaly (Leinster quarter-final)
Most goals in a match:  8
Kilkenny 3-22 - 5-16 Galway (Leinster semi-final, drawn match)
Most points in a match: 50
Kilkenny 5-32 - 1-18 Offaly (Leinster quarter-final)
Clare 2-25 - 2-25 Wexford (All-Ireland qualifier)
Most goals by one team in a match: 5
Wexford 5-19 - 0-21 Antrim (Leinster quarter-final)
Kilkenny 5-32 - 1-18 Offaly (Leinster quarter-final)
Kilkenny 3-22 - 5-16 Galway (Leinster semi-final, drawn match)
Tipperary 5-25 - 1-20 Offaly (All-Ireland qualifier)
 Highest aggregate score: 68
Kilkenny 5-32 - 1-18 Offaly (Leinster quarter-final)
Lowest aggregate score: 26
Carlow 0-14 - 1-9 Westmeath (Leinster qualifying group)
Most goals scored by a losing team: 4
Galway 4-13 - 3-25 Tipperary (All-Ireland qualifier)

Top scorers
Overall

Single game

Clean sheets

Discipline
 First red card of the championship: Aaron Craig for Westmeath against Antrim (27 April 2014)

Miscellaneous

 Limerick's 2–18 to 2-16 Munster semi-final defeat of Tipperary was their first victory over their near neighbours at Semple Stadium since 1973.
 Kilkenny's tally of 5-32, or 47 points, was the biggest score the Cats have posted in a championship match during Brian Cody's tenure as manager.
For the fourth time in five years the Munster champions were defeated in their All-Ireland semi-final.
The aggregate score of 4-50 (62) in the drawn All-Ireland final is the largest combined tally in a championship decider since 1970.
For the third year in-a-row the All-Ireland final ends in a draw.
Henry Shefflin of Kilkenny becomes the first player to win ten All-Ireland medals on the field of play.

Controversies

Involvement of the British Sky Broadcasting Group
The decision by the GAA to grant access to satellite broadcasting company BSkyB of Championship hurling was criticised in some quarters. The first attempt by Sky Sports to cover live televised hurling - a Leinster Championship encounter between Kilkenny and Offaly - drew an audience share of less than 10 per cent of that which tuned into the free-to-air Dublin/Laois encounter at Croke Park the following day. In addition, the match was erroneously billed in advance by Sky as a "Connacht GAA football" game.

Awards
Sunday Game Team of the Year
The Sunday Game team of the year was picked on 28 September, which was the night after the final replay. Richie Hogan was named the Sunday game player of the year.	

Darren Gleeson (Tipperary)
Paul Murphy (Kilkenny)
JJ Delaney (Kilkenny) 
Seamus Hickey (Limerick) 
Brendan Maher (Tipperary) 
Padraic Maher (Tipperary) 
Cillian Buckley (Kilkenny)
Richie Hogan (Kilkenny)
Conor Fogarty (Kilkenny) 
TJ Reid (Kilkenny), 
Patrick Maher (Tipperary) 
John O'Dwyer (Tipperary) 
Colin Fennelly (Kilkenny) 
Seamus Callinan (Tipperary)
Shane Dowling (Limerick)

All Star Team of the Year
Richie Hogan was named the All Stars player of the year with Cathal Barrett named as the young player of the year at the awards ceremony on 24 October.

References

External links
 Hurling Championships Proposals: 2014–2016 and beyond

2014 in hurling